This is a list of episodes from the anime series Monkey Magic.

References

Monkey Magic